Philippi is a large urban and semi-urban area in Cape Town's Cape Flats region, in the Western Cape, South Africa. It comprises the Philippi Horticultural Area to the west, and the neighbourhoods of Brown's Farm, Philippi East and Samora Machel located within its eastern half. The neighbourhoods of Gugulethu and Nyanga are located to its north. The horticultural area is sparsely populated compared to the surrounding city and contains many farms.

History
The nomadic Khoi pastoralists once used the land for grazing their animals and hunting for food. The first community of local residents was recorded in 1833 during which time it was known as "Die Duine" (The Dunes). The Philippi Germans arrived in Cape Town in three groups between 1860 and 1883, and became known for their ability to grow vegetables in the sandy soils of the Cape Flats. 

Until the 1970s the area was mainly used for grazing with a few farms located in the area.  Rapid residential growth began in the late 1970s and early 1980s as apartheid policies which tried to prevent economic migrants from the former Ciskei and Transkei homelands in the Eastern Cape, who settled in nearby Nyanga, Langa, Gugulethu, Crossroads, Browns Farm and Samora Machel. As resistance to apartheid grew in the 1980s Philippi increasingly became a place of refuge from the political unrest in the former homelands. Additional residents came to live in Philippi when farms in Mitchell's Plain were eliminated due to urban sprawl.

At least half of Cape Town's vegetables are grown in the Philippi Horticultural Area, despite being surrounded by residential suburbs which include townships, informal settlements and century-old neighbourhoods. The ability to grow produce is greatly aided by the fact that the area sits on top of a large aquifer. The Germans developed farming methods over three generations to adapt to the extreme weather conditions and sandy soil. One of these practices was no-till farming. Its use is being reintroduced and encouraged today.

In the apartheid era it was designated for Coloureds who represented 70.5% with the remainder consisting of those identified as black Africans.

Economy 
The Philippi Horticultural Area provides up to 80% of Cape Town's fresh produce. Continuing urban development within the horticultural area has been controversial amid concerns that it will have a negative impact on food sustainability within Cape Town broadly. The area's agricultural activities generate R484 million of economic output annually. 

Philippi is seen by government and businesses as ideal for certain business related developments.  Philippi is slated for a number of large developments including the 'Philippi Mini-City'.

References 

Townships in the Western Cape
Suburbs of Cape Town